Souleymane Aw (born 5 April 1999) is a Senegalese footballer.

Career
Born in Senegal, Aw began playing youth football at the Aspire Academy in his home country. He signed a professional contract with Eupen in June 2017.

On 14 August 2019, he joined French club Béziers.

International
He represented his country at the 2017 Africa U-20 Cup of Nations, 2017 FIFA U-20 World Cup, 2019 Africa U-20 Cup of Nations and 2019 FIFA U-20 World Cup.

References

1999 births
Living people
People from Kaolack Region
Senegalese footballers
Senegal youth international footballers
Association football defenders
Aspire Academy (Senegal) players
K.A.S. Eupen players
K.S.V. Roeselare players
AS Béziers (2007) players
Gil Vicente F.C. players
Belgian Pro League players
Challenger Pro League players
Championnat National players
Championnat National 3 players
Senegalese expatriate footballers
Senegalese expatriate sportspeople in Belgium
Senegalese expatriate sportspeople in France
Senegalese expatriate sportspeople in Portugal
Expatriate footballers in Belgium
Expatriate footballers in France
Expatriate footballers in Portugal